Veronika Husárová is a beauty queen who won the title of Miss Slovakia in 2007, and represented Slovakia in Miss World 2007 in Sanya, China.  She is in law school and hopes to qualify as a lawyer.

In 2008, she appeared as a professional dancer in the Slovak version of Dancing with the Stars.

References

Miss World 2007 delegates
1987 births
Living people
Slovak beauty pageant winners
People from Komárno